is a Japanese actor, singer and model. He was a member of the Korean boy group Cross Gene. Takuya is also well known as the former Japanese Representative on Korean variety television Show, JTBC's Non-Summit.

Biography

Early life
In 2008, Takuya took part in the 21st Junon Superboy Contest. After making it through to the finals, Takuya was awarded the Special Jury Prize. Takuya signed with Japanese Entertainment Label Amuse, Inc. and starred in a handful of Amuse productions including Japanese Drama SIGN and stage musical Black & White. In 2010, Takuya transferred to the Korean subsidiary branch 'Amuse Korea' to join Project A (later named Cross Gene), an all-male Asian pop group to be made up of members from the different East Asian countries.

2012: K-Pop Debut
Takuya debuted as an idol with the boy group, Cross Gene, on June 7, 2012, as the leader and vocalist of the group. He is known as the "Gorgeous Gene". Takuya later participated in and promoted movie roles including Live Action movie Ai Ore! in which he played the supporting role Kiryuuin Ruii alongside Karam from K-pop group DGNA. Takuya debuted for a second time in Japan, this time as a Pop Idol as a member of Cross Gene on March 13, 2013, with the release of the groups first Japanese single Shooting Star. During Cross Gene's Cross U concert in Japan, Takuya advised that he had given up the leadership role in Cross Gene.

In early 2014 Takuya took part in filming Cross Gene's project movie ZEDD in which he played the role of XI. Following promoting with Cross Gene for their first Korean comeback, Takuya joined Korean variety TV Show Non-Summit on JTBC as the representative for Japan. Takuya was well received by Korean audiences and earned the nickname Mr Slender hands (섬섬옥수) for his attractive hands. With the shows sudden popularity Takuya also experienced an increase in popularity. In November, Takuya was MC on the Red Carpet of the Melon Music Awards. Takuya also starred in the Music Video for Starship Entertainment Collaboration Hyolyn x Jooyoung, Erase. On 5 December Takuya was awarded the International Exchange Daesang at the Korean Hallyu Awards in recognition of his commitment to contributing to and sharing of Korean culture through both his position as a member of Cross Gene and as a panellist on the Korean variety show Non-Summit. In 2015 Takuya appeared in Mnet drama The Lover as "Takuya". He has appeared in movies and dramas in Japan, but he made his first acting debut in Korea with this drama.

In 2017, Takuya was selected as the torch relayer of the 2018 PyeongChang Winter Olympic Games and ran in the Masan District located in Changwon as the 57th torchbearer on November 14. On December 10, 2018, Takuya announced his departure from Cross Gene following the expiration of his contract with Amuse Korea. He subsequently signed with a new label.

Filmography

Television drama

Film

Theatre and Musical

Variety show

Awards and nominations

JUNON Superboy Contest

Korean Hallyu Awards

References

External links
 
 

1992 births
Living people
Japanese male television actors
Japanese male film actors
Japanese male models
People from Ibaraki Prefecture
Japanese K-pop singers
Japanese expatriates in South Korea
21st-century Japanese male actors
21st-century Japanese singers
Amuse Inc. talents
21st-century Japanese male singers